Concord is a town in Pike County, Georgia, United States. The population was 375 at the 2010 census.

History
The Georgia General Assembly incorporated the place in 1887 as the "Town of Concord". The community took its name from the Concord Primitive Baptist Church, which stood at the site since the early 1840s.

Geography

Concord is located at  (33.090848, -84.438913).

Concord is located on Georgia State Route 18.

Demographics

As of the census of 2000, there were 336 people, 118 households, and 92 families residing in the town. The racial makeup of the town was 73.81% White, 24.70% African American, and 1.49% from two or more races. Hispanic or Latino of any race were 0.60% of the population.

There were 118 households, out of which 38.1% had children under the age of 18 living with them, 60.2% were married couples living together, 15.3% had a female householder with no husband present, and 22.0% were non-families. 20.3% of all households were made up of individuals, and 11.9% had someone living alone who was 65 years of age or older.  The average household size was 2.85 and the average family size was 3.26.

In the town, the population was spread out, with 29.8% under the age of 18, 8.3% from 18 to 24, 27.7% from 25 to 44, 22.3% from 45 to 64, and 11.9% who were 65 years of age or older.  The median age was 37 years. For every 100 females, there were 96.5 males.  For every 100 females age 18 and over, there were 87.3 males.

The median income for a household in the town was $40,795, and the median income for a family was $47,250. Males had a median income of $29,167 versus $15,625 for females. The per capita income for the town was $15,908.  About 2.1% of families and 5.4% of the population were below the poverty line, including 3.8% of those under age 18 and 8.5% of those age 65 or over.

Education
Concord Public Schools are part of the Pike County School District. The school district has one Pre-K building (lottery funded), one primary school (K-2), one elementary school (3-5), one middle school (6-8), a ninth grade academy and one high school.

Michael Duncan, Ed. D. is the Superintendent of Schools.

References

Towns in Pike County, Georgia
Towns in Georgia (U.S. state)